The Korea Electrotechnology Research Institute (KERI, Korean: :ko: 한국전기연구원) is a non-profit government-funded research institute in Republic of Korea. Established in 1976, KERI contributes to research on electrotechnology and testing of power apparatus. The main office is in Changwon, Republic of Korea and two branches are in Ansan and Uiwang, Gyeonggi-do, Korea. As of 2008, KERI has about 530 employees including 300 researchers.

History 
 December 29, 1976: Korea Electric Research and Testing Institute (KERTI) was established
 January 20, 1981: Korea Electrotechnology and Telecommunications Research Institute (KETRI) was established (Consolidation of KERTI and KTRI)
 June 17, 1985: Korea Electrotechnology Research Institute (KERI) was separated from KETRI

Organization 
 Electric Power Research Division
 Industry Applications Research Division
 Advanced Materials & Application Research Division
 Medical Devices Research Division
 High Power High Voltage Testing & Evaluation Division
 Power Apparatus Testing & Evaluation Division
 Planning & Coordination Division
 General Administration Division

Presidents 
 Ko Chang-seok (1985–1986)
 Ahn U-hui (1986–1993)
 Byeon Seung-bong (1993–1996
 Youn Mun-su (1996–1999)
 Kwan Yeong-hwan (1999–2005)
 Bak Dong-uk (2005–2008)
 Yu Tae-hwan (2008–2011)
 Kim Ho-yong (2011–2014)
 Bak Gyeong-yeob (2014–2017)
 Choe Gyu-ha (2018–2021)
 Myeong Seoung-ho (2021–June 10, 2022)
 Kim Nam-kyun (January 12, 2023– )

Locations 
 KERI Changwon (HQ): 12, Bulmosna-ro 10 beon-gil, Seongsan-gu, Changwon-si, Gyeongsangnam-do 51543, Korea
 KERI Ansan: 111, Hanggaul-ro, Sangnok-gu, Ansan-si, Gyeonggi-do 15588, Korea
 KERI Uiwang: 138, Naesonsunhwan-ro, Uiwang-si, Gyeonggi-do 16029, Korea

References

External links 
 KERI English-version website
 Ministry of Science and ICT
 National Research Council of Science and Technology

Research institutes in South Korea
Research institutes established in 1976
1976 establishments in South Korea